Talk to the hand is an English language slang phrase.

The phrase is also used in the title of:
 Talk to the Hand: Live in Michigan, a live album and DVD by Barenaked Ladies
 "Talk to the Hand", a song by Honeyz
 Talk to the Hand: The Utter Bloody Rudeness of the World Today, or Six Good Reasons to Stay Home and Bolt the Door, a book by Lynne Truss
 "Parle à ma main" ("Talk to the hand " in English), a 2006 song recorded by French act Fatal Bazooka featuring Yelle
 "Talk to the Hand", an episode of Dexter